Sir Iftikhar Ahmad Ayaz, KBE, is a businessperson and an honorary consular official for Tuvalu.

Background and nature of work

Based at Tuvalu House, London, England, Ayaz is the Honorary Consul for the Commonwealth realm of Tuvalu in London.

Ayaz has not been Tuvalu's only consular representative in Europe in recent times, since Tuvalu has maintained a consulate in Basel, Switzerland, for some years, but he is that country's principal, permanent consular appointee based in the United Kingdom.

Personal

Dr. Ayaz is also closely involved with the International Commission of Peace (ICOP) and holds doctorates in Human Development and Education, and a master's degree in Linguistics. He has worked closely with a number of United Nations-linked organizations.

He is also a member of the Ahmadiyya Muslim Community.

See also

 Tuvalu#Foreign relations

References

External links
 Dr. Iftikhar A. Ayaz (photo): 
 http://www.link2exports.co.uk/regions.asp?pid=2130&lsid=3515&edname=18981.htm&ped=18885
 http://www.exporttuvalu.com/EmbassiesOf.aspx?CountryCode=CH
 http://www.icopeace.org/about/

Knights Commander of the Order of the British Empire
Tuvaluan diplomats
Living people
Year of birth missing (living people)
Tuvaluan Ahmadis
British Ahmadis